Deh-e Molla Abdollah (also Romanized as Deh-e Mollā ‘Abdollāh; also known as Mollā ‘Abdollāh) is a village in Dust Mohammad Rural District, in the Central District of Hirmand County, Sistan and Baluchestan Province, Iran. At the 2006 census, its population was 40, in 8 families.

References 

Populated places in Hirmand County